Lithium laurate is an metallorganic compound with the chemical formula .  It is classified as a metallic soap, i.e. a metal derivative of a fatty acid.    In contrast to the lubricants lithium stearate and  lithium 12-hydroxystearate, lithium laurate is of minor commercial value..

Physical properties
Lithium laurate forms colorless crystals of the tetragonal crystal system, with cell parameters a = 2.83 nm, c = 1.17 nm, and 24 formula units per cell (Z = 24).

Lithium laurate is slightly soluble in water, ethanol, and diethyl ether.

References

Laurates
Lithium compounds